Ing 3 is a Swedish military designation (3rd Engineers) that has been used by the following units:

 Uppland Regiment (1902–1937)
 Royal Boden Engineer Corps (1937–1974)
 Boden Engineer Regiment (1975–1994)
 Norrland Engineer Corps (1994–2000)